Jean de Castellane (24 April 1868 – 13 September 1965) was a French politician and member of the house of Castellane. In 1898 he married  Dorothée de Talleyrand-Périgord.  He was born and died in Paris.

Life
He was the second son of Antoine de Castellane and the brother of Boniface and Stanislas. He initially served as a cavalry officer but left the army in 1902 to stand in the legislative elections in Cantal. He was elected, but disqualified for bribery and beaten in the by-election that followed. He was a municipal counsellor in Paris from 1919 to 1944 and was vice-president of the municipal council in 1928 and then from 1930 to 1931. He was also general counsellor for Seine He was finally political career as president of the French Swimming Federation.

Sources 
  " Jean de Castellane ", dans le Dictionnaire des parlementaires français (1889–1940), sous la direction de Jean Jolly, PUF, 1960

1868 births
1965 deaths
20th-century French politicians
Jean
Presidents of the French Swimming Federation